Vezins or Vézins may refer to the following places in France:

Vezins, Maine-et-Loire, in the Maine-et-Loire département 
Vezins, a former commune that is now a part of Isigny-le-Buat in the Manche département
Vézins-de-Lévézou, in the Aveyron département
Barrage de Vezins, au fleuve Sélune

See also
Vezin, a surname